Day of the Dupes (in ) is the name given to a day in November 1630 on which the enemies of Cardinal Richelieu mistakenly believed that they had succeeded in persuading King Louis XIII of France to dismiss Richelieu from power. The incident is thought to have occurred on the 10th, 11th, or 12th of that month.

In November 1630, the political relations between the cardinal and the queen mother, the Italian-born Marie de' Medici, reached a crisis. In a stormy scene on 10 November, in the Luxembourg Palace, Marie de' Medici and the cardinal met in the king's presence. The queen mother demanded the cardinal's dismissal, declaring that the king had to choose between him and her.

No immediate decision came from this conference, but the king retired to his hunting lodge in Versailles. Richelieu seems to have believed that his political career was over, but the intercession of influential friends saved the minister from impending disgrace. While the apartments of the Luxembourg Palace were thronged by the cardinal's enemies celebrating his fall, Richelieu followed the king to Versailles, where the monarch assured him of continued support.  Marie eventually exiled herself to Compiègne. 

The "Day of the Dupes," as this event was called, marks the complete restoration of the cardinal to royal favor.

In literature
A historical novel by Stanley J. Weyman, Under the Red Robe (adapted into film in 1915, 1923 and 1937) concerns the Day of the Dupes. The Day of the Dupes also forms the plot in Alexandre Dumas' novel The Red Sphinx.

References

Bibliography
 
 
 
 

Political history of the Ancien Régime
1630 in France
1630 in politics
Louis XIII
Cardinal Richelieu